The R177 road is a regional road in Ireland linking Lisdoo and the Border with Northern Ireland in County Louth. The road continues as the A29 across the border in Northern Ireland.

See also 

 Roads in Ireland
 National primary road
 National secondary road

References 

Regional roads in the Republic of Ireland
Roads in County Louth